The 2015 Girabola was the 37th season of top-tier football in Angola. The season ran from 11 February to 10 October 2015. Recreativo do Libolo survived a late-season scare from 1º de Agosto to win their fourth Angolan championship, all in the past five years. Recreativo do Libolo needed a scoreless draw against Académica do Lobito in their final game to finish in a tie atop the standings with 1º de Agosto, who closed the season with six straight wins. Recreativo do Libolo won the tiebreaker based on head-to-head points.

The league comprised 16 of teams and the bottom three were relegated to the 2016 Segundona. Domant, Onze Bravos and Sporting de Cabinda finished in the last three spots and were relegated.

Teams
A total of 16 teams contested the league, including 13 sides from the 2014 season and three promoted from the 2014 Segundona, Académica do Lobito, Domant and Progresso Lunda Sul.

Recreativo do Libolo were the defending champions from the 2014 season.

Changes from 2014 season
Relegated: Primeiro de Maio, Benfica do Lubango, União do Uíge 
Promoted: Académica do Lobito, Domant FC, Progresso da Lunda Sul

Stadiums and locations

League table

Results

Positions by round

Source: Girabola

Season statistics

Top scorers

Hat-tricks

See also
2015 Segundona

References

External links
Girabola 2015 stats at jornaldosdesportos.sapo.ao
Federação Angolana de Futebol

Girabola seasons
1
Angola
Angola